Hoven's carp (Leptobarbus hoevenii; Jelawat in Malay), also known as the mad barb or sultan fish, is a species of fish in the barb family.

Named in honor of Bleeker’s fellow Dutchman, “le célèbre professeur de zoologie” Jan van der Hoeven (1801-1868).

Ecology
It is native to freshwater habitats in the Thai-Malay Peninsula, Borneo and Sumatra. In peninsular malaysia, this species is only found the states of Perak and Pahang. However, a single specimen was caught in the Bernam River, Selangor. Populations further north in the Chao Phraya and Mekong Basins were included in this species until 2009, but are now considered a separate species, L. rubripinna. The two are frequently confused and the same common names have been used for both; only L. rubripinna is known from the aquarium trade.

A midwater to near bottom dweller. frequently lives in groups. Stomach contents shows signs of an omnivorous diet, mainly shrimp, insect larvae and green matter.

Economic Importance
In Malaysia, it is a highly prized food fish, being one of the most expensive fish in the country, wild specimens can be sold for thousands of ringgit. Due to this they are overfished and are now rare in the wild, further increasing their value and local fishermen's incentive to catch it. Their soft meat and scales are considered a delicacy.

Cultural History
In Malaysia, the reason for its other common local name, translated to "The Sultan Fish" is attributed to the claim that the fish was a favorite among royal members and that palace workers would go to markets and call for any fishermen that had the Sultan's fish. By word of mouth, the fish was then referred as the Sultan's fish.

Another version is that a particular Sultan loved eating the fish so much that he decreed that peasants were not allowed to eat the fish if they were to catch it, and that the fish was to be brought to the palace for the Sultan.

References 

hoevenii
Barbs (fish)
Taxa named by Pieter Bleeker
Fish described in 1851